USS T-2 has been the name of more than one United States Navy ship, and may refer to:

 , later SF-2, a fleet submarine in commission from 1922 to 1923
 USS T-2 (SST-2), a training submarine in commission from 1953 to 1973, renamed  in 1956

United States Navy ship names